38th meridian may refer to:

38th meridian east, a line of longitude east of the Greenwich Meridian
38th meridian west, a line of longitude west of the Greenwich Meridian